The 2005 Ukrainian Cup Final was a football match that took place at the NSC Olimpiyskiy on 29 May 2005. The match was the 14th Ukrainian Cup Final and it was contested by Shakhtar Donetsk and Dynamo Kyiv. The Olympic stadium is the traditional arena for the Cup final. The game was remembered for involving the most foreign players in the Ukrainian Cup finals: out of 36 players on both teams' rosters, 28 were from outside of Ukraine. Of the starting line-ups, there were five Brazilians, four Ukrainians, four Romanians, and others. Refereeing the match was a Norwegian team of referees.

Road to Kyiv 

All 16 Ukrainian Premier League clubs do not have to go through qualification to get into the competition; Dynamo and Shakhtar therefore both qualified for the competition automatically.

Previous Encounters

Match details

Match statistics

See also
 2004–05 Ukrainian Cup
 2004–05 Ukrainian Premier League

References

External links 

Cup Final
Ukrainian Cup finals
Ukrainian Cup Final 2005
Ukrainian Cup Final 2005
Sports competitions in Kyiv